is a Japanese male badminton player. In 2012, he won the Maldives International tournament in the men's doubles event partnered with Kazuya Itani. In 2017, he won the China International Challenge tournament in the mixed doubles event partnered with Rie Etoh.

Achievements

BWF International Challenge/Series
Men's Doubles

Mixed Doubles

 BWF International Challenge tournament
 BWF International Series tournament
 BWF Future Series tournament

References

External links 
 
 

1987 births
Living people
Sportspeople from Hokkaido
Japanese male badminton players
21st-century Japanese people